Aida Khasanova (born 4 August 1983) is an Uzbekistani fencer and international fencing referee.  She is Uzbekistani fencing champion on foil of 1998, 1999, 2000, 2002 and won Uzbekistan Cup on saber in 2008. She competed in the individual foil events at the World Championships in Saint Petersburg, Russia in 2007 and Turin, Italy in 2006 representing Uzbekistan.

In 2014 Khasanova became the first international fencing referee in the history of Uzbekistan fencing on three weapons  and since then has been a Fédération Internationale d'Escrime referee at major international fencing championships and tournaments.

In 2019 Khasanova was selected to be the first referee from Uzbekistan and Central Asia to go to the Olympic Games in Tokyo. She will also be the only female fencing referee representing Asia at the 2020 Games.

References

1983 births
Living people
Uzbekistani female foil fencers
20th-century Uzbekistani women
21st-century Uzbekistani women